William Clayton ( – 3 July 1783) of Harleyford Manor, near Great Marlow  was an English politician.

He was the second surviving son of Sir William Clayton, 1st Baronet (died 1744), and the younger brother of Sir Kenrick Clayton, 2nd Baronet. He was educated at the Middle Temple.

He was a Member of Parliament (MP) for Bletchingley from 1745 to 1761, and for Great Marlow from 1761 to 1783.

His son William (1762–1834) succeeded to the baronetcy on the death of his cousin Sir Robert Clayton, 3rd Baronet.

References 
 

1718 births
Year of birth uncertain
1783 deaths
Members of the Parliament of Great Britain for English constituencies
British MPs 1741–1747
British MPs 1747–1754
British MPs 1754–1761
British MPs 1761–1768
British MPs 1768–1774
British MPs 1774–1780
British MPs 1780–1784
Younger sons of baronets